Stretched C (ʗ) is a letter of the Latin alphabet used to represent a kind of click consonant. This sound has been described as alveolar, postalveolar, retroflex and palatal by different linguists.

Stretched C was part of the International Phonetic Alphabet (where its designation was "postalveolar") until 1989, when it was replaced by [ǃ]. The palatal click was replaced by [ǂ].

References

See also
 Click letter

C stretched
C stretched